Alkerton is a village in Gloucestershire, England. It is located along the M5 motorway just east of the River Severn.
It is part of the parish of Eastington, and adjoins the village of Eastington at Eastington Cross

External links 
 
 

Villages in Gloucestershire
Stroud District